Colgrain is a village in Argyll and Bute, Scotland, located to the east of Helensburgh.

The name Colgrain is known from at least 1377 when Sir William Denzeltoun (of Colgrane) gives his consent to a grant made by his father, Sir John Denzeltoun of that Ilk, to the church of Glasgow.

See also

 Jock Campbell, Baron Campbell of Eskan 'of Camis Eskan in the County of Dumbarton'. His great grandfather Colin Campbell (Junior) of Colgrain and Camis Eskan (1818–86), a wealthy sugar merchant who owned plantations in British Guiana.

References

Villages in Argyll and Bute